A potting bench or gardening table is a kind of workbench used for small gardening tasks such as transplanting seedlings. A basic potting bench has a work surface at bench height, comfortable for a standing person; and storage for potting soil, pots, and tools. The same furniture is often also used to display potted plants, even indoors. 

Since this type of furniture is often exposed to soil, water, and sunlight, it must be made from weather-resistant materials if it is not to decay rapidly. Cedar wood is a popular choice. Plastic potting benches are cheaper and, for those who can afford it, there is teak. Metal construction may be considered if corrosion can be controlled. 

Some potting benches are small and portable; others are fixed into the side of a greenhouse. Some designs include a dry sink for soil storage, a water or drain hookup, and/or a cold frame. As they are often custom built by the gardener, styles vary greatly — and do it yourself construction plans are widely available.

See also 
 Gardening
 Transplanting

External links 

Gardening tools